This is a list of instruments used specially in Gastroenterology.


Instrument list

Image gallery

References 

Medical equipment
Gastroenterology